Katie Maree Mack (born 14 September 1993) is an Australian cricketer who plays as a right-handed batter and right-arm leg break bowler for the ACT Meteors in the Women's National Cricket League (WNCL) and Adelaide Strikers in the Women's Big Bash League (WBBL). She has previously played for Essex, Melbourne Stars and Birmingham Phoenix. Mack made her maiden WNCL century on 20 December 2014, scoring 106 from 131 balls in a five-wicket defeat to Queensland Fire.

In January 2022, Mack was named in Australia's A squad for their series against England A, with the matches being played alongside the Women's Ashes.

References

External links

Katie Mack at Cricket Australia

1993 births
Living people
Cricketers from Sydney
Sportswomen from New South Wales
Australian women cricketers
Australian expatriate sportspeople in England
ACT Meteors cricketers
Adelaide Strikers (WBBL) cricketers
Essex women cricketers
Melbourne Stars (WBBL) cricketers
Birmingham Phoenix cricketers